The 1971 Cleveland Indians season was the 71st in franchise history. The team finished sixth in the American League East with a record of 60–102, 43 games behind the Baltimore Orioles.

Regular season 
In the summer of 1971, Indians owner Vernon Stouffer was entertaining overtures with regards to the Cleveland Indians playing 27 to 30 home dates a year in New Orleans.

Season standings

Record vs. opponents

Opening Day Lineup

Roster

Player stats

Batting
Note: G = Games played; AB = At bats; R = Runs; H = Hits; 2B = Doubles; 3B = Triples; HR = Home runs; RBI = Run batted in; AVG = Batting average; SB = Stolen bases

Pitching
Note: W = Wins; L = Losses; ERA = Earned run average; G = Games pitched; GS = Games started; SV = Saves; IP = Innings pitched; R = Runs allowed; ER = Earned runs allowed; BB = Walks allowed; K = Strikeouts

Awards and honors 
All-Star Game
 Ray Fosse, Gold Glove Award

Farm system

Notes

References 
1971 Cleveland Indians at Baseball Reference
1971 Cleveland Indians at Baseball Almanac

Cleveland Guardians seasons
Cleveland Indians season
Cincinnati Indians